Fresh Blood for Tired Vampyres is the fourteenth studio album by Detroit rock band Electric Six and the twelfth in their official canon. It was first released on October 7, 2016 at a performance in the House of Blues in New Orleans, before going on general release. Original album art is credited to Andrea Mastrovito.

Track listing
All lyrics written by Tyler Spencer; all music composed by Spencer except where noted.

CD version
 "Acid Reducer"
 "The Number of the Beast" (Spencer, Tait)
 "Mood is Improving" (Spencer, Nash)
 "I'll Be in Touch" (Spencer, Tait, Nash)
 "Lottery Reptiles" (Spencer, Tait, Nash)
 "Dance with Dark Forces" (Spencer, Nash, Malosh)
 "(Be My) Skin Caboose" (Spencer, Nash)
 "My Dreams"
 "I Got the Box" (Spencer, Nash)
 "Lee Did This to Me" (Spencer, Nash)
 "Greener Pastures"  (Spencer, Tait)
 "The Lover's Pie"  (Spencer, Nash)
 "Space Walkin'"

Personnel
 Dick Valentine - vocals
  - lead guitar, drum programming
 Da Ve - rhythm guitar
 Tait Nucleus? - keyboards
 Rob Lower - bass

Legacy
 A remix of "Lottery Reptiles" was included on the "Roulette Stars of Metro Detroit" soundtrack album ahead of this album's release.
 The band performed "I'll Be In Touch" and "(Be My) Skin Caboose" on their second live album "You're Welcome!".
 Stretch goals for the Kickstarter campaign used to fund production of "You're Welcome!" secured funding for the production of music videos for the songs "I'll Be In Touch" and "I Got the Box". The first video, "I'll Be In Touch" was released on May 22, 2017, and was a shot-for-shot remake of the music video for "Sometimes a Fantasy" by Billy Joel. The second video, "I Got the Box", is to be a direct sequel to "That Voodoo You Do, or The Legba Luncheon", a short film written by and starring Electric Six frontman, Tyler Spencer, and also featuring Electric Six synthesizer player, Christopher Tait.

References

Electric Six albums
2016 albums